is a Japan-exclusive pocket billiards video game for the Sega Saturn and PlayStation. Like its predecessor, Side Pocket 2, it features the in-game likeness of a real-life professional pool player. In this case, it's JPBA member, Kyoko Sone. The game is the third and final installment of the Side Pocket series.

Gameplay 

Unlike the prior installments in the Side Pocket series, Side Pocket 3 renders the pool room environment with 3D polygons. In spite of this, the table can still be viewed in a traditional, top-down fashion.

Play modes consist of: story mode, training mode, trick game mode, and versus mode. Game variants include eight ball, nine ball, rotation, 14.1 continuous, bowlliards, cutthroat, carom billiards, poker, pocket game (a homage to the original game), and yotsudama.

Reception 
Weekly Famitsu scored the PlayStation version at 25 out of 40, claiming that it was more or less the same as its Sega Saturn counterpart.

Brazilian magazine Ação Games gave the Saturn version 8 out of 10.

See also 
 Side Pocket

References

External links 
 Side Pocket 3 (PS) at GameFAQs
 Side Pocket 3 (SAT) at GameFAQs

1997 video games
Cue sports video games
Data East video games
Japan-exclusive video games
PlayStation (console) games
Sega Saturn games
Multiplayer and single-player video games
Video games developed in Japan